Russell White (born 4 June 1992) is an Irish triathlete. He competed in the men's event at the 2020 Summer Olympics.

References

External links
 

1992 births
Living people
Irish male triathletes
Olympic triathletes of Ireland
Triathletes at the 2020 Summer Olympics
People from Banbridge
Sportspeople from County Down
Triathletes from Northern Ireland
Commonwealth Games competitors for Northern Ireland
Triathletes at the 2014 Commonwealth Games